Cantata is a 1963 Hungarian drama film directed by Miklós Jancsó and starring Zoltán Latinovits, Andor Ajtay and Gyula Bodrogi.

After witnessing a senior doctor about whom he had doubts bring back a patient from cardiac arrest a young doctor with peasant roots comes to question his whole life when the doctor collapses from the struggle. Feeling that his progress from peasant's son to city doctor was made too smoothly, without a need to struggle or learn about life, and has made him arrogant and lonely, he comes to realise he has become gradually estranged from his own class and background after he returns to visit his hometown.

Its Hungarian title is Oldás és kötés ("Loosening and Tightening"). The English title comes from Béla Bartók's Cantata Profana. Its story, heard as a radio broadcast in the film, echos the conflict within the young doctor. It relates to nine sons raised by their father only to hunt, who know nothing of work, and spend all their time in the forest. The nine were turned magically into stags and, although recognised by their father, their altered natures mean they cannot return to live in their home.

Cast
 Zoltán Latinovits as Járom Ambrus dr.
 Andor Ajtay as Ádámfy professzor
 Béla Barsi as Ambrus apja
 Miklós Szakáts as Docens
 Gyula Bodrogi as Kiss Gyula
 Edit Domján as Márta, Ambrus szerelme
 Mária Medgyesi as Eta
 Gyöngyvér Demjén as Fiatal lány

References

External links
 

1963 drama films
1963 films
Films directed by Miklós Jancsó
1960s Hungarian-language films
Hungarian drama films